Naval anti-aircraft guns include anti-aircraft guns specially designed or adapted for mounting on ships, and naval guns adapted for high-angle fire.

Naval
Naval anti-aircraft guns